Viacheslav Lavrov (30 April 1958-2000) was a professional ice hockey player who played in the Soviet Hockey League.  He played for SKA St. Petersburg.  He also played for the Soviet team during the 1987 Rendez-vous '87 against the NHL All-Stars.

Lavrov was killed in a car crash in 2000.

References

External links
 

1958 births
Russian ice hockey players
Soviet ice hockey players
2000 deaths
SKA Saint Petersburg players